This is a list of members of the 15th Bundestag – the lower house of parliament of the Federal Republic of Germany, whose members were in office from 17 October 2002 until 17 October 2005.



Summary 
This summary includes changes in the numbers of the four caucuses (CDU/CSU, SPD, FDP, Greens):

Members

A 
 Ulrich Adam, CDU
 Karl Addicks, FDP
 Ilse Aigner, CSU
 Lale Akgün, SPD
 Peter Altmaier, CDU
 Kerstin Andreae, Bündnis 90/Die Grünen
 Gerd Andres, SPD
 Ingrid Arndt-Brauer, SPD
 Rainer Arnold, SPD
 Artur Auernhammer, CSU
 Dietrich Austermann, CDU

B 
 Hermann Bachmaier, SPD
 Daniel Bahr, FDP
 Ernst Bahr, SPD
 Doris Barnett, SPD
 Hans-Peter Bartels, SPD
 Eckhardt Barthel, SPD
 Klaus Barthel, SPD
 Norbert Barthle, CDU
 Sören Bartol, SPD
 Sabine Bätzing-Lichtenthäler, SPD
 Wolf Bauer, CDU
 Günter Baumann, CDU
 Ernst-Reinhard Beck, CDU
 Marieluise Beck, Bündnis 90/Die Grünen
 Volker Beck, Bündnis 90/Die Grünen
 Uwe Beckmeyer, SPD
 Cornelia Behm, Bündnis 90/Die Grünen
 Veronika Bellmann, CDU
 Birgitt Bender, Bündnis 90/Die Grünen
 Klaus Uwe Benneter, SPD
 Axel Berg, SPD
 Ute Berg, SPD
 Christoph Bergner, CDU
 Otto Bernhardt, CDU
 Matthias Berninger, Bündnis 90/Die Grünen
 Hans-Werner Bertl, SPD
 Grietje Bettin, Bündnis 90/Die Grünen
 Petra Bierwirth, SPD
 Rolf Bietmann, CDU
 Rudolf Bindig, SPD
 Lothar Binding, SPD
 Clemens Binninger, CDU
 Carl-Eduard von Bismarck, CDU
 Renate Blank, CSU
 Peter Bleser, CDU
 Antje Blumenthal, CDU
 Kurt Bodewig, SPD
 Maria Böhmer, CDU
 Gerd Bollmann, SPD
 Alexander Bonde, Bündnis 90/Die Grünen
 Jochen Borchert, CDU
 Wolfgang Börnsen, CDU
 Wolfgang Bosbach, CDU
 Wolfgang Bötsch, CSU
 Klaus Brähmig, CDU
 Klaus Brandner, SPD
 Helmut Brandt, CDU
 Willi Brase, SPD
 Ralf Brauksiepe, CDU
 Helge Braun, CDU
 Paul Breuer, CDU
 Bernhard Brinkmann, SPD
 Hans-Günter Bruckmann, SPD
 Rainer Brüderle, FDP
 Monika Brüning, CDU
 Angelika Brunkhorst, FDP
 Georg Brunnhuber, CDU
 Edelgard Bulmahn, SPD
 Marco Bülow, SPD
 Ulla Burchardt, SPD
 Ernst Burgbacher, FDP
 Michael Bürsch, SPD
 Hans Martin Bury, SPD
 Verena Butalikakis, CDU
 Hans Büttner, SPD
 Hartmut Büttner, CDU

C 
 Cajus Julius Caesar, CDU
 Manfred Carstens, CDU
 Peter Harry Carstensen, CDU
 Marion Caspers-Merk, SPD
 Gitta Connemann, CDU

D 
 Peter Danckert, SPD
 Helga Daub, FDP
 Herta Däubler-Gmelin, SPD
 Leo Dautzenberg, CDU
 Hubert Deittert, CDU
 Ekin Deligöz, Bündnis 90/Die Grünen
 Albert Deß, CSU
 Roland Dieckmann, CDU
 Karl Diller, SPD
 Alexander Dobrindt, CSU
 Vera Dominke, CDU
 Thomas Dörflinger, CDU
 Martin Dörmann, SPD
 Marie-Luise Dött, CDU
 Peter Dreßen, SPD
 Elvira Drobinski-Weiß, SPD
 Thea Dückert, Bündnis 90/Die Grünen
 Jutta Dümpe-Krüger, Bündnis 90/Die Grünen
 Detlef Dzembritzki, SPD

E 
 Christian Eberl, FDP
 Sebastian Edathy, SPD
 Siegmund Ehrmann, SPD
 Hans Eichel, SPD
 Maria Eichhorn, CSU
 Franziska Eichstädt-Bohlig, Bündnis 90/Die Grünen
 Martina Eickhoff, SPD
 Uschi Eid, Bündnis 90/Die Grünen
 Marga Elser, SPD
 Rainer Eppelmann, CDU
 Gernot Erler, SPD
 Petra Ernstberger, SPD
 Jörg van Essen, FDP
 Karin Evers-Meyer, SPD
 Anke Eymer, CDU

F 
 Georg Fahrenschon, CSU
 Ilse Falk, CDU
 Annette Faße, SPD
 Hans Georg Faust, CDU
 Albrecht Feibel, CDU
 Hans-Josef Fell, Bündnis 90/Die Grünen
 Enak Ferlemann, CDU
 Elke Ferner, SPD
 Ingrid Fischbach, CDU
 Axel Fischer, CDU
 Dirk Fischer, CDU
 Hartwig Fischer, CDU
 Joschka Fischer, Bündnis 90/Die Grünen
 Ulrike Flach, FDP
 Maria Flachsbarth, CDU
 Klaus-Peter Flosbach, CDU
 Gabriele Fograscher, SPD
 Rainer Fornahl, SPD
 Hans Forster, SPD
 Herbert Frankenhauser, CSU
 Gabriele Frechen, SPD
 Dagmar Freitag, SPD
 Otto Fricke, FDP
 Hans-Peter Friedrich, CSU
 Horst Friedrich, FDP
 Lilo Friedrich, SPD
 Erich G. Fritz, CDU
 Jochen-Konrad Fromme, CDU
 Michael Fuchs, CDU
 Hans-Joachim Fuchtel, CDU
 Rainer Funke, FDP

G 
 Peter Gauweiler, CSU
 Jürgen Gehb, CDU
 Norbert Geis, CSU
 Wolfgang Gerhardt, FDP
 Roland Gewalt, CDU
 Eberhard Gienger, CDU
 Georg Girisch, CSU
 Iris Gleicke, SPD
 Michael Glos, CSU
 Günter Gloser, SPD
 Ralf Göbel, CDU
 Reinhard Göhner, CDU
 Hans-Michael Goldmann, FDP
 Uwe Göllner, SPD
 Tanja Gönner, CDU
 Josef Göppel, CSU
 Katrin Göring-Eckardt, Bündnis 90/Die Grünen
 Peter Götz, CDU
 Wolfgang Götzer, CSU
 Renate Gradistanac, SPD
 Angelika Graf, SPD
 Ute Granold, CDU
 Dieter Grasedieck, SPD
 Monika Griefahn, SPD
 Kerstin Griese, SPD
 Kurt-Dieter Grill, CDU
 Reinhard Grindel, CDU
 Hermann Gröhe, CDU
 Gabriele Groneberg, SPD
 Michael Grosse-Brömer, CDU
 Achim Großmann, SPD
 Wolfgang Grotthaus, SPD
 Markus Grübel, CDU
 Manfred Grund, CDU
 Joachim Günther, FDP
 Karl-Theodor zu Guttenberg, CSU
 Olav Gutting, CDU
 Karlheinz Guttmacher, FDP

H 
 Karl Hermann Haack, SPD
 Hans-Joachim Hacker, SPD
 Bettina Hagedorn, SPD
 Klaus Hagemann, SPD
 Holger Haibach, CDU
 Anja Hajduk, Bündnis 90/Die Grünen
 Christel Happach-Kasan, FDP
 Alfred Hartenbach, SPD
 Christoph Hartmann, FDP
 Michael Hartmann, SPD
 Anke Hartnagel, SPD
 Gerda Hasselfeldt, CSU
 Nina Hauer, SPD
 Klaus Haupt, FDP
 Klaus-Jürgen Hedrich, CDU
 Helmut Heiderich, CDU
 Hubertus Heil, SPD
 Ursula Heinen-Esser, CDU
 Ulrich Heinrich, FDP
 Siegfried Helias, CDU
 Uda Heller, CDU
 Reinhold Hemker, SPD
 Rolf Hempelmann, SPD
 Barbara Hendricks, SPD
 Michael Hennrich, CDU
 Winfried Hermann, Bündnis 90/Die Grünen
 Antje Hermenau, Bündnis 90/Die Grünen
 Jürgen Herrmann, CDU
 Gustav Herzog, SPD
 Petra Heß, SPD
 Peter Hettlich, Bündnis 90/Die Grünen
 Monika Heubaum, SPD
 Bernd Heynemann, CDU
 Gisela Hilbrecht, SPD
 Gabriele Hiller-Ohm, SPD
 Stephan Hilsberg, SPD
 Ernst Hinsken, CSU
 Peter Hintze, CDU
 Robert Hochbaum, CDU
 Klaus Hofbauer, CSU
 Gerd Höfer, SPD
 Iris Hoffmann, SPD
 Jelena Hoffmann, SPD
 Walter Hoffmann, SPD
 Ulrike Höfken, Bündnis 90/Die Grünen
 Frank Hofmann, SPD
 Martin Hohmann, CDU
 Birgit Homburger, FDP
 Thilo Hoppe, Bündnis 90/Die Grünen
 Joachim Hörster, CDU
 Eike Hovermann, SPD
 Werner Hoyer, FDP
 Klaas Hübner, SPD
 Christel Humme, SPD
 Hubert Hüppe, CDU
 Michaele Hustedt, Bündnis 90/Die Grünen

I 
 Lothar Ibrügger, SPD
 Barbara Imhof, SPD
 Brunhilde Irber, SPD

J 
 Susanne Jaffke, CDU
 Renate Jäger, SPD
 Peter Jahr, CDU
 Jann-Peter Janssen, SPD
 Klaus-Werner Jonas, SPD
 Egon Jüttner, CDU

K 
 Johannes Kahrs, SPD
 Bartholomäus Kalb, CSU
 Steffen Kampeter, CDU
 Irmgard Karwatzki, CDU
 Ulrich Kasparick, SPD
 Bernhard Kaster, CDU
 Susanne Kastner, SPD
 Michael Kauch, FDP
 Siegfried Kauder, CDU
 Volker Kauder, CDU
 Gerlinde Kaupa, CSU
 Ulrich Kelber, SPD
 Hans-Peter Kemper, SPD
 Klaus Kirschner, SPD
 Eckart von Klaeden, CDU
 Jürgen Klimke, CDU
 Lars Klingbeil, SPD
 Julia Klöckner, CDU
 Hans-Ulrich Klose, SPD
 Astrid Klug, SPD
 Bärbel Kofler, SPD
 Heinz Köhler, SPD
 Heinrich Leonhard Kolb, FDP
 Manfred Kolbe, CDU
 Walter Kolbow, SPD
 Hellmut Königshaus, FDP
 Norbert Königshofen, CDU
 Gudrun Kopp, FDP
 Jürgen Koppelin, FDP
 Fritz Rudolf Körper, SPD
 Karin Kortmann, SPD
 Hartmut Koschyk, CSU
 Thomas Kossendey, CDU
 Rolf Kramer, SPD
 Anette Kramme, SPD
 Ernst Kranz, SPD
 Rudolf Kraus, CSU
 Nicolette Kressl, SPD
 Michael Kretschmer, CDU
 Gunther Krichbaum, CDU
 Günter Krings, CDU
 Martina Krogmann, CDU
 Volker Kröning, SPD
 Jutta Krüger-Jacob, Bündnis 90/Die Grünen
 Angelika Krüger-Leißner, SPD
 Hans-Ulrich Krüger, SPD
 Horst Kubatschka, SPD
 Wolfgang Kubicki, FDP
 Ernst Küchler, SPD
 Hermann Kues, CDU
 Helga Kühn-Mengel, SPD
 Fritz Kuhn, Bündnis 90/Die Grünen
 Werner Kuhn, CDU
 Ute Kumpf, SPD
 Renate Künast, Bündnis 90/Die Grünen
 Markus Kurth, Bündnis 90/Die Grünen
 Undine Kurth, Bündnis 90/Die Grünen
 Uwe Küster, SPD

L 
 Christine Lambrecht, SPD
 Karl A. Lamers, CDU
 Norbert Lammert, CDU
 Helmut Lamp, CDU
 Christian Lange, SPD
 Barbara Lanzinger, CSU
 Karl-Josef Laumann, CDU
 Sibylle Laurischk, FDP
 Monika Lazar, Bündnis 90/Die Grünen
 Christine Lehder, SPD
 Waltraud Lehn, SPD
 Harald Leibrecht, FDP
 Vera Lengsfeld, CDU
 Ina Lenke, FDP
 Werner Lensing, CDU
 Elke Leonhard, SPD
 Peter Letzgus, CDU
 Sabine Leutheusser-Schnarrenberger, FDP
 Eckhart Lewering, SPD
 Ursula Lietz, CDU
 Walter Link, CDU
 Eduard Lintner, CSU
 Klaus Lippold, CDU
 Patricia Lips, CDU
 Götz-Peter Lohmann, SPD
 Markus Löning, FDP
 Gabriele Lösekrug-Möller, SPD
 Reinhard Loske, Bündnis 90/Die Grünen
 Erika Lotz, SPD
 Gesine Lötzsch, PDS
 Christine Lucyga, SPD
 Daniela Ludwig, CSU
 Anna Lührmann, Bündnis 90/Die Grünen
 Michael Luther, CDU

M 
 Dorothee Mantel, CSU
 Dirk Manzewski, SPD
 Tobias Marhold, SPD
 Lothar Mark, SPD
 Caren Marks, SPD
 Erwin Marschewski, CDU
 Christoph Matschie, SPD
 Hilde Mattheis, SPD
 Conny Mayer, CDU
 Martin Mayer, CSU
 Stephan Mayer, CSU
 Markus Meckel, SPD
 Wolfgang Meckelburg, CDU
 Ulrike Mehl, SPD
 Michael Meister, CDU
 Angela Merkel, CDU
 Petra Merkel, SPD
 Ulrike Merten, SPD
 Angelika Mertens, SPD
 Friedrich Merz, CDU
 Doris Meyer, CSU
 Laurenz Meyer, CDU
 Maria Michalk, CDU
 Hans Michelbach, CSU
 Klaus Minkel, CDU
 Ursula Mogg, SPD
 Jürgen Möllemann, FDP
 Jerzy Montag, Bündnis 90/Die Grünen
 Marlene Mortler, CSU
 Bernward Müller, CDU
 Christian Müller), SPD
 Gerd Müller, CSU
 Hildegard Müller, CDU
 Kerstin Müller, Bündnis 90/Die Grünen
 Michael Müller, SPD
 Stefan Müller, CSU
 Gesine Multhaupt, SPD
 Franz Müntefering, SPD
 Rolf Mützenich, SPD

N 
 Winfried Nachtwei, Bündnis 90/Die Grünen
 Silke Stokar von Neuforn, Bündnis 90/Die Grünen
 Bernd Neumann, CDU
 Volker Neumann, SPD
 Christa Nickels, Bündnis 90/Die Grünen
 Dirk Niebel, FDP
 Dietmar Nietan, SPD
 Henry Nitzsche, CDU
 Michaela Noll, CDU
 Claudia Nolte, CDU
 Günther Friedrich Nolting, FDP
 Günter Nooke, CDU
 Georg Nüßlein, CSU

O 
 Erika Ober, SPD
 Franz Obermeier, CSU
 Holger Ortel, SPD
 Melanie Oßwald, CSU
 Friedrich Ostendorff, Bündnis 90/Die Grünen
 Eduard Oswald, CSU
 Eberhard Otto, FDP
 Hans-Joachim Otto, FDP

P 
 Detlef Parr, FDP
 Petra Pau, PDS
 Heinz Paula, SPD
 Rita Pawelski, CDU
 Peter Paziorek, CDU
 Ulrich Petzold, CDU
 Joachim Pfeiffer, CDU
 Sibylle Pfeiffer, CDU
 Johannes Pflug, SPD
 Friedbert Pflüger, CDU
 Beatrix Philipp, CDU
 Cornelia Pieper, FDP
 Gisela Piltz, FDP
 Andreas Pinkwart, FDP
 Ronald Pofalla, CDU
 Ruprecht Polenz, CDU
 Joachim Poß, SPD
 Wilhelm Priesmeier, SPD
 Simone Probst, Bündnis 90/Die Grünen
 Florian Pronold, SPD

R 
 Sascha Raabe, SPD
 Thomas Rachel, CDU
 Hans Raidel, CSU
 Peter Ramsauer, CSU
 Helmut Rauber, CDU
 Peter Rauen, CDU
 Karin Rehbock-Zureich, SPD
 Christa Reichard, CDU
 Katherina Reiche, CDU
 Gerold Reichenbach, SPD
 Carola Reimann, SPD
 Hans-Peter Repnik, CDU
 Günter Rexrodt, FDP
 Klaus Riegert, CDU
 Christel Riemann-Hanewinckel, SPD
 Heinz Riesenhuber, CDU
 Walter Riester, SPD
 Reinhold Robbe, SPD
 Hannelore Roedel, CSU
 Franz Romer, CDU
 Heinrich-Wilhelm Ronsöhr, CDU
 Klaus Rose, CSU
 René Röspel, SPD
 Kurt Rossmanith, CSU
 Ernst Dieter Rossmann, SPD
 Claudia Roth, Bündnis 90/Die Grünen
 Karin Roth, SPD
 Michael Roth, SPD
 Norbert Röttgen, CDU
 Gerhard Rübenkönig, SPD
 Christian Ruck, CSU
 Volker Rühe, CDU
 Ortwin Runde, SPD
 Albert Rupprecht, CSU
 Marlene Rupprecht, SPD
 Peter Rzepka, CDU

S 
 Krista Sager, Bündnis 90/Die Grünen
 Thomas Sauer, SPD
 Anton Schaaf, SPD
 Anita Schäfer, CDU
 Axel Schäfer, SPD
 Gudrun Schaich-Walch, SPD
 Rudolf Scharping, SPD
 Wolfgang Schäuble, CDU
 Hartmut Schauerte, CDU
 Christine Scheel, Bündnis 90/Die Grünen
 Bernd Scheelen, SPD
 Hermann Scheer, SPD
 Siegfried Scheffler, SPD
 Andreas Scheuer, CSU
 Irmingard Schewe-Gerigk, Bündnis 90/Die Grünen
 Horst Schild, SPD
 Otto Schily, SPD
 Norbert Schindler, CDU
 Georg Schirmbeck, CDU
 Rezzo Schlauch, Bündnis 90/Die Grünen
 Angela Schmid, CDU
 Bernd Schmidbauer, CDU
 Horst Schmidbauer, SPD
 , Bündnis 90/Die Grünen
 , CDU
 Christian Schmidt, CSU
 Dagmar Schmidt, SPD
 Silvia Schmidt, SPD
 Ulla Schmidt, SPD
 , SPD
 Heinz Schmitt, SPD
 Carsten Schneider, SPD
 Andreas Schockenhoff, CDU
 Walter Schöler, SPD
 Olaf Scholz, SPD
 Karsten Schönfeld, SPD
 Fritz Schösser, SPD
 Wilfried Schreck, SPD
 Ottmar Schreiner, SPD
 Gerhard Schröder, SPD
 Kristina Schröder, CDU
 Ole Schröder, CDU
 Bernhard Schulte-Drüggelte, CDU
 Brigitte Schulte, SPD
 Reinhard Schultz, SPD
 Swen Schulz, SPD
 Werner Schulz, Bündnis 90/Die Grünen
 Uwe Schummer, CDU
 Angelica Schwall-Düren, SPD
 Martin Schwanholz, SPD
 Rolf Schwanitz, SPD
 Wilhelm Josef Sebastian, CDU
 Horst Seehofer, CSU
 Kurt Segner, CDU
 Matthias Sehling, CSU
 Marita Sehn, FDP
 Marion Seib, CSU
 Heinz Seiffert, CDU
 Petra Selg, Bündnis 90/Die Grünen
 Bernd Siebert, CDU
 Thomas Silberhorn, CSU
 Erika Simm, SPD
 Johannes Singhammer, CSU
 Sigrid Skarpelis-Sperk, SPD
 Hermann Otto Solms, FDP
 Cornelie Sonntag-Wolgast, SPD
 Ursula Sowa, Bündnis 90/Die Grünen
 Jens Spahn, CDU
 Wolfgang Spanier, SPD
 Margrit Spielmann, SPD
 Jörg-Otto Spiller, SPD
 Max Stadler, FDP
 Ditmar Staffelt, SPD
 Rainder Steenblock, Bündnis 90/Die Grünen
 Erika Steinbach, CDU
 Christian von Stetten, CDU
 Ludwig Stiegler, SPD
 Rainer Stinner, FDP
 Rolf Stöckel, SPD
 Gero Storjohann, CDU
 Andreas Storm, CDU
 Dorothea Störr-Ritter, CDU
 Christoph Strässer, SPD
 Max Straubinger, CSU
 Rita Streb-Hesse, SPD
 Matthäus Strebl, CSU
 Hans-Christian Ströbele, Bündnis 90/Die Grünen
 Thomas Strobl, CDU
 Lena Strothmann, CDU
 Peter Struck, SPD
 Michael Stübgen, CDU
 Joachim Stünker, SPD

T 
 Jörg Tauss, SPD
 Michael Terwiesche, FDP
 Jella Teuchner, SPD
 Gerald Thalheim, SPD
 Carl-Ludwig Thiele, FDP
 Wolfgang Thierse, SPD
 Dieter Thomae, FDP
 Franz Thönnes, SPD
 Antje Tillmann, CDU
 Edeltraut Töpfer, CDU
 Jürgen Trittin, Bündnis 90/Die Grünen
 Marianne Tritz, Bündnis 90/Die Grünen
 Jürgen Türk, FDP

U 
 Hans-Jürgen Uhl, SPD
 Hans-Peter Uhl, CSU
 Hubert Ulrich, Bündnis 90/Die Grünen

V 
 Arnold Vaatz, CDU
 Rüdiger Veit, SPD
 Simone Violka, SPD
 Antje Vogel-Sperl, Bündnis 90/Die Grünen
 Volkmar Vogel, CDU
 Jörg Vogelsänger, SPD
 Ute Vogt, SPD
 Marlies Volkmer, SPD
 Antje Vollmer, Bündnis 90/Die Grünen
 Ludger Volmer, Bündnis 90/Die Grünen
 Angelika Volquartz, CDU
 Andrea Voßhoff, CDU

W 
 Gerhard Wächter, CDU
 Hans-Georg Wagner, SPD
 Marco Wanderwitz, CDU
 Hedi Wegener, SPD
 Andreas Weigel, SPD
 Petra Weis, SPD
 Reinhard Weis, SPD
 Matthias Weisheit, SPD
 Gerald Weiß), CDU
 Peter Weiß, CDU
 Gunter Weißgerber, SPD
 Gert Weisskirchen, SPD
 Ernst Ulrich von Weizsäcker, SPD
 Ingo Wellenreuther, CDU
 Jochen Welt, SPD
 Rainer Wend, SPD
 Hildegard Wester, SPD
 Guido Westerwelle, FDP
 Lydia Westrich, SPD
 Inge Wettig-Danielmeier, SPD
 Margrit Wetzel, SPD
 Andrea Wicklein, SPD
 Annette Widmann-Mauz, CDU
 Heidemarie Wieczorek-Zeul, SPD
 Jürgen Wieczorek, SPD
 Dieter Wiefelspütz, SPD
 Klaus-Peter Willsch, CDU
 Brigitte Wimmer, SPD
 Willy Wimmer, CDU
 Josef Winkler, Bündnis 90/Die Grünen
 Claudia Winterstein, FDP
 Volker Wissing, FDP
 Matthias Wissmann, CDU
 Engelbert Wistuba, SPD
 Barbara Wittig, SPD
 Werner Wittlich, CDU
 Wolfgang Wodarg, SPD
 Verena Wohlleben, SPD
 Dagmar Wöhrl, CSU
 Ingo Wolf, FDP
 Margareta Wolf, Bündnis 90/Die Grünen
 Waltraud Wolff, SPD
 Heidemarie Wright, SPD
 Elke Wülfing, CDU

Z 
 Uta Zapf, SPD
 Wolfgang Zeitlmann, CSU
 Wolfgang Zöller, CSU
 Manfred Zöllmer, SPD
 Christoph Zöpel, SPD
 Willi Zylajew, CDU

See also 
 Politics of Germany
 List of Bundestag Members

15
2002 establishments in Germany